Flat Rock is a census-designated place in northeastern Thompson Township, Seneca County, Ohio, United States.  It has a post office with the ZIP code 44828.

Demographics

History
Flat Rock was originally called Lewisville, and under the latter name was platted in 1841. A post office called Flat Rock has been in operation since 1846. The present name comes from a flat layer of rock covering an artesian aquifer.

Place of interest
Seneca Caverns

References

Census-designated places in Ohio
Census-designated places in Seneca County, Ohio